Anton High School is a public secondary school located in the city of Anton, Texas, USA and classified as a 1A school by the UIL.  It is a part of the Anton Independent School District located in southwestern Hockley County.   In 2015, the school was rated "Met Standard" by the Texas Education Agency.

Academics
UIL Literary Criticism Champions - 
1993(1A)

Athletics
The Anton Bulldogs compete in these sports - 

Cross Country, 6-Man Football, Basketball, Powerlifting, Tennis & Track

State Titles
Boys Golf - 
1971(B)

References

External links
Anton ISD website

Public high schools in Texas
Schools in Hockley County, Texas